EPIC and Racecourse is a light rail station on the Canberra Metro R1 Civic to Gungahlin line. Although technically located in the suburb of Lyneham, the station primarily serves Exhibition Park in Canberra (EPIC) - home to major annual events including Summernats, the National Folk Festival and Royal Canberra Show as well as Thoroughbred Park, the city's main venue for horse racing. The station is generally quiet outside of major events at these venues, serving the least passengers of any station on the line in the first 10 months of operation. Prior to the opening of the line, a park and ride facility was in use for ACTION bus commuters, this was temporarily relocated in 2016, but reopened in 2019 once construction was completed. In addition to the park and ride facilities, the station also provides bicycle racks. EPIC and Racecourse is unique on the line as it is the only station that is not constructed within the centre median of a major road.

Light rail services 
All services in both directions stop at the station. As it is the last station before north-bound light rail vehicles reach the depot, some peak hour services also terminate here.

References

Light rail stations in Canberra
Railway stations in Australia opened in 2019